Mehdi Mahdavi (born 13 February 1984) is an Iranian volleyball player, who former played as a setter for the Iran national team of the year 2007–2016. After competing at the 2016 Summer Olympics he announced his retirement from the national team aiming to give more chances to younger players. Mahdavi is married and has a daughter and a son.

Honours

National team
Asian Championship
Gold medal (2): 2011, 2013
Silver medal (1): 2009
Asian Games
Gold medal (1): 2014
Silver medal (1): 2010
Asian Cup
Gold medal (2): 2008, 2010
Asian U20 Championship
Gold medal (1): 2002
U19 World Championship
Silver medal (1): 2001
Asian U18 Championship
Gold medal (1): 2001

Club
Asian Championship
Gold medal (2): 2016, 2017 (Sarmayeh Bank)
Iranian Super League
Champions (1): 2016 (Sarmayeh Bank)

Individual
Best Setter: 2016 Asian Club Championship

References

External links

FIVB profile

People from Karaj
Iranian men's volleyball players
1984 births
Living people
Asian Games gold medalists for Iran
Asian Games silver medalists for Iran
Asian Games medalists in volleyball
Volleyball players at the 2010 Asian Games
Volleyball players at the 2014 Asian Games
Olympic volleyball players of Iran
Volleyball players at the 2016 Summer Olympics
Medalists at the 2010 Asian Games
Medalists at the 2014 Asian Games
21st-century Iranian people